Penicillium mononematosum is an anamorph species of the genus Penicillium which produces viriditoxin.

Further reading

References 

mononematosum
Fungi described in 1989